The New Guinea mudskipper (Periophthalmus novaeguineaensis) is a species of mudskippers native to fresh and brackish waters along the coasts of Australia and Indonesia.  This species occurs in estuaries and tidal creeks as well as mangrove forests and nipa palm stands  This species can reach a length of  SL.

References

External links 
 Fishes of Australia : http://fishesofaustralia.net.au/home/species/2259

New Guinea mudskipper
Fish of Indonesia
Fish of New Guinea
Marine fish of Northern Australia
New Guinea mudskipper